William Chambers (born 1979) is a British milliner who creates handmade hats and headpieces sold through department stores.

References

External links 
 Official Website

British milliners
Living people
1979 births